An t-Athair Liam Ó Beirne was an Irish language writer and activist.

Liam Ó Beirne was born at Milltown, County Galway in August 1871 in the townland of Carrownageehy to Thomas and Bridget (née Quinn) Beirne. Irish was the spoken language at home. Beirne attended Ballindine National School in Co. Mayo. After completing his primary educating, Beirne attended St Jarlath's College in Tuam. He then went on to join the priesthood, registering at St Patrick's College, Maynooth on 3 September 1892.

He was ordained a priest for the Tuam Archdiocese in Galway City on 19 November 1899. He Wrote under pseudonyms  An Beirneach and An Fear Mór Maoil. His books An Troid agus an tUaigneas and Seo Suid won him much acclaim. 

Fr. Beirne died in 1949, aged 78 years. He is buried at Kilclooney Graveyard, Milltown. His ordination chalice, with his parents' marriage tokens affixed to it, is on display in the Milltown Heritage Centre.

In 1999, the centenary of Fr. Byrne's ordination in 1899, was celebrated in his native Milltown in recognition of the village's Irish language past. The celebration also marked the centenary of the death of his fellow Milltown man and prominent Gael, Mícheál Ó Lócháin. At this celebration, a wreath was laid on "An Beirneach's" grave at Kilclooney Cemetery, Milltown by his two surviving relatives. This was followed by Mass in Irish in St. Joseph's Church, Milltown and an interlude of Irish music performed by local musicians.

Bibliography

 An Troid agust an tUaigneas, Mc Ghuill, 1926.
 Seo Siúd, O'Gorman, 1934.
 The Irish Speaker examined home (attributed).

References

Irish language activists
People from County Galway
19th-century Irish people
Irish writers